Butyricimonas faecihominis is a bacterium from the genus of Butyricimonas has been isolated from human faeces.

References

Bacteria described in 2014
Bacteroidia